"Aeroplane" is a song by American rock band Red Hot Chili Peppers from their sixth studio album, One Hot Minute (1995). It was the third single released from the album and a music video accompanied its release. Although the song was left off the band's Greatest Hits album, the music video was included on the accompanying DVD.

Critical reception
Larry Flick from Billboard wrote, "This delightful flight of fancy from the Chili Peppers shows why the act continues to succeed in spite of a frequently changing lineup and evolving musical tastes. An attractive pop tune pepped up with Flea's characteristic funk bass, "Aeroplane" may not be the Peppers' finest piece, but it is exceptionally radio friendly."

Chart performance
The single peaked at number eight on the Modern Rock Tracks chart where "My Friends" hit number one and "Warped" hit number seven. However, it outperformed "Warped"'s number 13 placing on the Mainstream Rock Tracks chart (where "My Friends" was also a number one hit) by peaking at number 12. It was the only crossover hit from the album hitting number 30 on the Mainstream Top 40 chart where the other two singles failed to do. It was also the highest-charting single in the UK from the album, peaking at number 11.

Live performances
"Aeroplane" was the most performed song during the band's One Hot Minute tour. However, like all songs from the One Hot Minute album, with the exception of "Pea", it wasn't performed again following the departure of Dave Navarro until February 6, 2016, at Pier 70 in San Francisco, where the song was performed for the first time since 1997. The song was played regularly during The Getaway World Tour.

Track listing
 CD single 1
 "Aeroplane" (clean edit)
 "Backwoods" (live) (contains intro tease of "Come As You Are")
 "Transcending" (live) (contains intro tease of "Hey Joe")
 "Me and My Friends" (live)

Note: Live tracks recorded in Rotterdam, Holland on October 16, 1995, by Veronica (Kink FM)

 Limited edition CD single 2
 "Aeroplane" (album version)
 "Suck My Kiss" (live)
 "Suffragette City" (David Bowie) (live)

Note: Live tracks were recorded in Rotterdam, Holland on October 16, 1995, by Veronica (Kink FM)

Personnel
Red Hot Chili Peppers
 Anthony Kiedis – lead vocals
 Dave Navarro – guitar
 Flea – bass, backing vocals
 Chad Smith – drums

The "Aeroplane" Kids
 Clara Balzary – backing vocals
 Bailey Reise – backing vocals
 Askia Ndegéocello – backing vocals
 Nadia Wehbe – backing vocals
 Sarabeth Kelly – backing vocals
 Matthew Kelly – backing vocals
 Phillip Greenspan – backing vocals
 Perry Greenspan – backing vocals
 Veronica Twigg – backing vocals
 Remy Greeno – backing vocals
 C.J. Chipley – backing vocals
 Jaclyn DiMaggio – backing vocals
 Hayley Oakes – backing vocals
 Nikolai Giefer – backing vocals
 Taiana Giefer – backing vocals
 Nina Rothburg – backing vocals
 Sheera Ehrig – backing vocals
 Jade Chacon – backing vocals

Charts

Weekly charts

Year-end charts

References

1995 songs
1996 singles
Red Hot Chili Peppers songs
Song recordings produced by Rick Rubin
Songs written by Anthony Kiedis
Songs written by Chad Smith
Songs written by Dave Navarro
Songs written by Flea (musician)
Warner Records singles